Gymnogeophagus lipokarenos is a species of geophagine cichlid. It inhabits parts of the Uruguay and Río Negro rivers. It is characterised by the absence of supraneural bones, the presence of a forward spine in its first dorsal fin pterygiophore, the absence of an oblique bar between the eye and nape, possessing a black marking near the dorsal fin origin that projects to its dorsum, as well as other features.

References

lipokarenos
Taxa named by Luiz Roberto Malabarba
Taxa named by Maria Claudia de Souza Lima Malabarba
Taxa named by Roberto Esser dos Reis
Fish described in 2015